Andreas Petropoulos, Greek professional basketball player
Antonis Petropoulos, Greek professional footballer
Elias Petropoulos, Greek author, folklorist and urban historian
Jonathan Petropoulos (born  1961), American historian
Georgios Petropoulos, former name of Peter G. Peterson  (1926 – 2018), American investment banker
Georgios Petropoulos (1872 – 1937), Greek fencer and shooter
Kostas Petropoulos, Greek former professional basketball coach, and a retired professional basketball player
Lakis Petropoulos, former Greek football player and manager
Renée Petropoulos, contemporary artist

Greek-language surnames